The flag of Rwanda was adopted on 25 October 2001.

Details 
The flag has three colours: blue, yellow, and green, The light blue band represents happiness and peace, the yellow band symbolizes economic development, and the green band symbolizes the hope of prosperity. The yellow sun represents enlightenment.

The flag represents national unity, respect for work, heroism, and confidence in the future. According to the state's official rationale, the flag was adopted (along with a new national anthem at the time) to avoid connotations to the 1994 genocide which it stated the previous one embodied. However, some Rwandans at the time expressed doubts about the reasoning and viewed it as an attempt by the ruling Rwandan Patriotic Front to express its political power by changing state symbols. The flag was designed by Alphonse Kirimobenecyo.

When hung vertically, the flag should be displayed as the horizontal version rotated clockwise 90 degrees.

Previous flag 
Rwanda's previous flag was a red-yellow-green tricolour with a large black letter "R" (to distinguish it from the otherwise identical flag of Guinea, with the "R" standing for Rwanda). Derived from the flag of Ethiopia, the colours green, yellow, and red represented peace, the nation's hope for its development, and the people. The colours were associated with Pan-African colours. The flag was changed because it ostensibly became associated with the brutality of the 1994 genocide. However, some Rwandans at the time expressed doubts about the stated reasoning and merely viewed all this as an attempt by the ruling Rwandan Patriotic Front to assert its political power by changing established state symbols.

Gallery

References

External links

Rwanda
National symbols of Rwanda
Rwanda
Rwanda